Partridge Lake is a lake in the municipality of Greenstone, Thunder Bay District in northwestern Ontario, Canada. It is in the Great Lakes Basin.

The main inflow is the Namewaminikan River at the east. A secondary inflow is Legault Creek at the south. The major outflow, at the northwest, is also the Namewaminikan River which flows via Lake Nipigon and the Nipigon River to Lake Superior.

References

Other map sources:

Lakes of Thunder Bay District